George Hayhoe is an engineer at Mercer University in Macon, Georgia. He was named a Fellow of the Institute of Electrical and Electronics Engineers (IEEE) in 2016 for his contributions to professional and technical communication.

References 

Fellow Members of the IEEE
Living people
Mercer University faculty
21st-century American engineers
Year of birth missing (living people)
American electrical engineers